Henry Charles Bullough (January 24, 1934 – November 24, 2019) was an American football player and coach.  He played college football at Michigan State and graduated in 1954.  Bullough was a starting guard for the Spartans team that won the 1954 Rose Bowl.  He was selected by the Green Bay Packers with the 53rd pick in the fifth round of the 1955 NFL Draft.

Coaching career
Bullough's first coaching position was at his alma mater, Michigan State, where he served for 11 seasons.  In 1970, he became linebackers coach for the Baltimore Colts of the National Football League (NFL) under head coach Don McCafferty.

As defensive coordinator for the New England Patriots in the 1970s Bullough is credited, along with his college teammate Chuck Fairbanks, with having been a significant figure in bringing the 3–4 defense to the NFL.  After Fairbanks was suspended prior to the final game of the 1978 season, Bullough's and fellow assistant Ron Erhardt were named co-head coaches for the remainder of the season.  After the season, Patriots owner Billy Sullivan appointed Erhardt head coach instead of Bullough.  Bullough would remain defensive coordinator for one more season with the Patriots.

In 1980, new Cincinnati Bengals head coach and former Green Bay Packers teammate, Forrest Gregg wooed Bullough to install the 3–4 defensive system in Cincinnati.  Two seasons later the Bengals would go to the Super Bowl where they fell just short against the San Francisco 49ers.  While with the Bengals, Bullough also tutored Dick LeBeau who, not only would succeed Bullough as defensive coordinator but, is credited as the innovator of the 3–4 zone blitz scheme.

Bullough also served as defensive coordinator for the Green Bay Packers in 1984. He was named the head coach for the Pittsburgh Maulers of the United States Football League (USFL) for the 1985 season, but the team folded after the 1984 season. He instead moved on to the Buffalo Bills, where he replaced Kay Stephenson for the final 12 games of the 1985 season and remained head coach for the first nine games of the 1986 season before being fired.

Personal life
Bullough was married to his wife of 49 years Lou Ann Bullough and they had three children together, Cheryl, Shane, and Chuck, and nine grandchildren, Corey, Kristi, Jake, Max, Riley, Byron, Holly, Chloe and Annika.

Head coaching record

^ Co-coach with Ron Erhardt

References

1934 births
2019 deaths
Sportspeople from Scranton, Pennsylvania
Players of American football from Pennsylvania
American football guards
Michigan State Spartans football players
Green Bay Packers players
Coaches of American football from Pennsylvania
Michigan State Spartans football coaches
Baltimore Colts coaches
New England Patriots coaches
New England Patriots head coaches
National Football League defensive coordinators
Cincinnati Bengals coaches
Buffalo Bills coaches
Buffalo Bills head coaches
Green Bay Packers coaches
United States Football League coaches
Detroit Lions coaches